This is a list of yearly Skyline Conference (1938–1962) football standings.

Standings

References

Mountain States
Standings